Old People's Home for 4 Year Olds is an Australian factual television series based on the Channel 4 British show of the same name. It premiered on the ABC and ABC iview on 27 August 2019 at 8:30 pm and shows once a week at 8:30 pm on Tuesdays.

The show follows 11 retirement home residents and 10 pre-school aged children, who spend time with each other playing games and participating in different planned and mixed activities.

It was renewed in August 2020 for a second series which premiered at 8:30 pm on 6 April 2021.

On 30 August 2022, ABC premiered a five-part series titled Old People's Home for Teenagers, where seniors aged between 74 to 93 years old, and teenagers aged between 14 and 16 years old, participate in the experience. During episode 2, after two weeks into the experiment, 76-year old senior participant James 'Jim' Tully died during filming. After a 5-day pause in filming, the episode dealt with his death and allowed the seniors and teenagers an opportunity to share in their grief of the loss of their new friend.

Series overview

Ratings

Series 1

Series 2

Awards and Accolades

See also

 List of Australian television series
 The Secret Life of 4 Year Olds
 Kids Say the Darndest Things
 The World's Strictest Parents
 The Voice Kids Australia

References

Australian Broadcasting Corporation original programming
Australian factual television series
2019 Australian television series debuts
English-language television shows
Television series about children
Television series by Endemol Australia